Madridejos, officially the Municipality of Madridejos,  is a 4th class municipality in the province of Cebu, Philippines. According to the 2020 census, it has a population of 42,039 people.

It is one of the three municipalities that make up the island of Bantayan, which lies to the west of the northern tip of Cebu. Madridejos is bordered to the north and west by the Visayan Sea, to the east is the town of Daanbantayan and to the south is the town of Bantayan.

History
Lawis was the old name of Madridejos. Even today people still use the name "Lawis", meaning "promontory", the portion carved out to constitute the municipality of Madridejos being the peninsula located on the northern side of Bantayan island facing the Visayan Sea.

During the time of governor Sebastián Hurtado de Corcuera (1635–1644), the Visayas were continually harassed by the Moros,  who wreaked dreadful havoc, capturing, massacring, robbing, sacking churches, and burning everything there was.

The kota (cota or cuta = fort) also built in 1630. Blowing of the budyong  served as signal of the coming of the Moros. It is the place from where the approach of the Moros could easily be seen, to give a timely warning to the townsfolk of their coming. All watchtowers on Bantayan were built by Fr. Doroteo Andrada del Rosario,  parish priest of Bantayan in the 19th century (Moro attacks were worst around 1840s).

The general scenery of Lawis was that of a quiet place, of virgin grounds covered by small shrubs and lantana. When more people discovered Lawis and flocked to it, the place became a visita.

In 1917 the pueblo Lawis became a municipality named Madridejos. This was the name given to the third town of Bantayan island in honour of Benito Romero de Madridejos the former archbishop of Cebu.  The town's feast day is celebrated annually on 8 December.

Immaculate Conception parish church

In the year 1600s, before Madridejos was made into a town, there was a barrio called Lawis at the tip of Bantayan island. In this barrio was a chapel built by the Augustinians who also built the parish church of Bantayan in the year 1580.

The chapel was located within the Spanish fort near the seashore. Inside the chapel, there was a framed picture of Our Lady of the Immaculate Conception which was the object of devotion and before which the Holy Rosary was prayed every afternoon. Once a month and during church feasts, the chapel was visited by the priest of Bantayan to say mass and celebrate its annual feast.

In the 1700s there was an image of La Virgen Purisima carved in the Island from batikuling wood. Folklore say there would be times when the clothes of the image were wet and damp although there was no rain, and was full of amorseko (crab grass)  – a kind of weed in the fields. During the time of the El Tor epidemic a beautiful lady was observed ministering to the sick mountain folks.

Since olden times, every October the Virgin is brought in a fluvial  procession and the Holy Rosary is prayed. The feast was celebrated every eight day of December, until Lawis became a parish in the year 1928.

Second World War

 1942 - occupation by Japanese Imperial forces.
 1945 - liberation by the Philippine Commonwealth troops of the 3rd, 8th, 82nd & 83rd Infantry Divisions of the Philippine Commonwealth Army which landed in Madridejos at the front of battles against Japanese forces in the Battle of Bantayan. The built of the general headquarters of the Philippine Commonwealth Army was stationed in Madridejos and active from 1945 to 1946 during and after the war.

Geography

Barangays
Madridejos comprises 14 barangays:

Climate

Demographics

Economy

The main industries of Madridejos are fishing, poultry and tourism.

Because of its rich fishing grounds, Madridejos earned the name of "Little Alaska of the Philippines": the first canning factory in the country was established here, but it lost its sustaining impact in the history of the municipality after it was bombed during World War II. At present, poultry-raising is a growing industry and Madridejos provides a substantial quantity of eggs produced for sale to the neighboring provinces.

Madridejos also hosts a fairly substantial tertiary college – Salazar College.

Transportation

Madridejos can be reached by boat from Cebu City via Santa Fe with 75-minutes ferry service to San Remigio (Hagnaya) via Island Shipping or SuperShuttle Ferry and also via Ceres bus from North Bus Terminal to Madridejos Vice-Versa. Bus (jeepney) travel to Madridejos via the municipality of Bantayan takes about a further hour.

There are currently NO overnight boats from Cebu City to Bantayan Island, nor are there any scheduled commercial air flights. Private air companies occasionally fly smaller Cessna and Piper aircraft into Bantayan Airport.

Media
There are two radio stations:
 DYRV-FM News Patrol 92.5 MHz
 Radyo Natin DYEE-FM 102.9 MHz

Notes

References

Sources

External links
 [ Philippine Standard Geographic Code]

Municipalities of Cebu